Sergei Anatolievich Gavrilov (born 27 January 1966) is a Russian politician who is a Deputy of the State Duma representing the Communist Party of the Russian Federation. He was born in Tula, during the time period of the Soviet Union; and would go on to receive a Candidate of Science in Economics, considered a PhD equivalent, from Moscow State University in 1989.

On September 18, 2016, he was elected as a deputy of the 7th State Duma as a member of the Communist Party.

He is one of the 324 members of the State Duma the United States Treasury sanctioned on 24 March 2022 in response to the 2022 Russian invasion of Ukraine.

2019 Georgia Protests 
He was invited to speak within Georgia's parliament through the Interparliamentary Assembly on Orthodoxy. This speech was done in Russian from the Speaker's chair and was seen as an attack on Georgian sovereignty. It would result in the 2019 Georgia protests.

Awards 

 Medal of the Order "For Merit to the Fatherland" 2nd class on August 26, 2016

References

1966 births
Living people
21st-century Russian politicians
Communist Party of the Russian Federation members
Russian Orthodox Christians from Russia
Christian communists
Russian communists
People from Tula, Russia
Moscow State University alumni
Recipients of the Medal of the Order "For Merit to the Fatherland" II class
Fifth convocation members of the State Duma (Russian Federation)
Sixth convocation members of the State Duma (Russian Federation)
Seventh convocation members of the State Duma (Russian Federation)
Eighth convocation members of the State Duma (Russian Federation)
Russian individuals subject to the U.S. Department of the Treasury sanctions